Kentaro Miyawaki (born 21 July 1978) is a Japanese snowboarder. He competed in the men's halfpipe event at the 2002 Winter Olympics.

References

1978 births
Living people
Japanese male snowboarders
Olympic snowboarders of Japan
Snowboarders at the 2002 Winter Olympics
Sportspeople from Nagano Prefecture
21st-century Japanese people